The Original SWAT World Challenge is an annual competition of law enforcement SWAT teams. It is usually held close to Little Rock, Arkansas, USA and its goals are to encourage exchange of ideas/techniques and promote the high level of tactical skills, mental focus and physical endurance possessed by SWAT Teams.

History 

The event began in 2004 under its original name of World SWAT Challenge and was won by San Antonio, Texas. In 2005, Germany's GSG 9 won all eight events and in 2006 won four of the eight events maintaining its top SWAT World Challenge ranking. The event was renamed Original SWAT World Challenge in 2005 when the tactical footwear company Original SWAT became title sponsor, and has since been expanded into the World SWAT Series which will include regional competitions capable of hosting 25–30 competing teams. The first of these was the Northeastern SWAT Challenge in late 2006, followed in 2007 by the addition of the Rocky Mountain Tactical Challenge, and a Mid-Western SWAT Challenge in 2008. These regional events follow the same format of the OSWC but with six events rather than eight, and are not limited to thirty teams.

OLN televised the 2007 event which was held 24–28 April close to Little Rock, Arkansas at Camp Joseph T. Robinson (National Guard Base). This could become the regular venue for the competition. Original SWAT Footwear Company has discontinued its sponsorship of the event, and is now the title sponsor of the 2008 Original SWAT Tactical World Cup.

Events 

Zodiac Attack
Scott Entry Problem
Leopard Challenge
Glock Pistol Shoot Off
Sniper Challenge
Vehicle Assault
3 Gun Challenge
Original SWAT Rage Run

Ranking 

These are the current rankings of the competing teams as of 2007. Most are designated from their city/state or country of origin.

References

External links 
 SWATSeries.com – Official website

Competitions
Law enforcement in the United States